Gilberto Navarro (19 May 1929 – 14 April 2005) was a Chilean sports shooter. He competed at the 1960 Summer Olympics and the 1964 Summer Olympics.

References

1929 births
2005 deaths
Chilean male sport shooters
Olympic shooters of Chile
Shooters at the 1960 Summer Olympics
Shooters at the 1964 Summer Olympics
Sportspeople from Santiago
Pan American Games medalists in shooting
Pan American Games gold medalists for Chile
Pan American Games bronze medalists for Chile
Shooters at the 1959 Pan American Games
Shooters at the 1967 Pan American Games
20th-century Chilean people